Ann Cook Whitman (June 11, 1908 – October 15, 1991) was an American secretary and government official who served as chief of staff to the vice president from 1974 to 1977.

Early life and education 
Whitman was a native of Perry, Ohio. She briefly attended Antioch College in Yellow Springs, Ohio.

Career 
Whitman moved to New York in 1929 to obtain work as a secretary. For many years, she was the personal secretary to David Levy, whose father was one of the founders of Sears, Roebuck and Company.

In 1952, while working as a secretary in the New York office of the Crusade for Freedom, Mrs. Whitman was recruited by Dwight D. Eisenhower’s presidential campaign staff. She went to Eisenhower’s headquarters at Denver, Colorado, where she became Eisenhower’s personal secretary. After Eisenhower was elected president, Whitman accompanied him to Washington, D.C., and served as his personal secretary the entire eight years of his presidency. She helped manage Eisenhower’s correspondence and was responsible for maintaining Eisenhower’s personal files which he kept in his office at the White House. The Ann Whitman File is held at the Eisenhower presidential library and has been deemed an "extraordinary resource" by historians.

When President Eisenhower left office in January 1961, Whitman accompanied him to his farm (now the Eisenhower National Historic Site) in Gettysburg, Pennsylvania, and continued to work for a few months as his personal secretary. She later joined the staff of New York Governor and later Vice President Nelson Rockefeller, for whom she worked until she retired in 1977. A biography of Whitman, entitled Confidential Secretary, was written by journalist Robert Donovan in 1988.

Personal life 
In 1941, Whitman married Edmund S. Whitman, an official of the United Fruit Company.

References

External links
 Ann Cook Whitman Biography, The Eisenhower Institute, Gettysburg College
 Interview with Ann C. Whitman conducted February 15, 1991, with Mack Teasley of the Dwight D. Eisenhower Presidential Library.
 Ann C. Whitman Papers, Dwight D. Eisenhower Presidential Library
 Papers of Dwight D. Eisenhower as President of the United States (Ann Whitman File), Dwight D. Eisenhower Presidential Library
 Ann C. Whitman Obituary, New York Times, October 17, 1991.

1908 births
1991 deaths
Chiefs of Staff to the Vice President of the United States
Eisenhower administration personnel
People from Perry, Ohio
Personal secretaries to the President of the United States